Awantipora or Avantipur or Aavantipur, known as Woontpor in Kashmiri, is a town, just opposite of Pulwama city, on the banks of the river Jhelum in the Pulwama district of Jammu and Kashmir, India. It is on the Jammu-Srinagar National Highway (now called the NH 44), south of Srinagar and north of Anantnag. Awantipora was named after the Kashmiri king Avantivarman and has the ruins of two 9th century Hindu temples built by him.

Awantipora tehsil is a subdistrict of Pulwama district.

History 
It is said that the town was founded by Avantivarman who was the first king of the Utpala dynasty, and ruled Kashmir from 855 to 883 AD. Avantivarman built a Hindu temple in Awantipora dedicated to Vishnu called "Avantisvamin" before he became king, and during his reign he built a second Hindu temple in Awantipora called "Avantisvara" dedicated to Shiva. Both temples were built in spacious rectangular paved courtyards. They were destroyed in the middle ages. They were excavated by the archeologist Daya Ram Sahni in the early 20th century. They are protected and maintained by the Archaeological Survey of India.

Demographics
As per the 2011 census, Awantipora has an average literacy rate of 69.41%, lower than the national average of 74%. Male literacy was 80.17%, and female literacy was 43.03% 9% of the population is under 6 years of age. Awantipora has a population of 12,647 people.

Villages in awantipora tehsil 
The villages along with their patwar halqa (revenue circle) in Awantipora  tehsil are listed below.

IUST Awantipora
Awantipora is home to Islamic University of Science and Technology(IUST) dating back to 2005. The university has been set up as a centre for higher learning for the people of the Union territory of Jammu and Kashmir and its neighbouring regions.

AIIMS Awantipora
The first batch of MBBS at the upcoming AIIMS at Awantipora in south Kashmir will start in August 2021. The temporary accommodation is in Srinagar.

Air force station
Awantipur Air Force Station is situated near Awantipora at Malangpora about 5 km from Pulwama town.

See also
 Tral
 Anantnag
 Martand Sun Temple
 Sun Temple

External links
 Ruins of Ancient Temples of Awantipora

References

Cities and towns in Pulwama district